Nazar Mohammad (5 March 1921 – 12 July 1996) was a Pakistani cricketer who played in five Test matches in 1952.  He was educated at Islamia College, Lahore.

Family 
His brother Feroz Nizami was a famous music composer while his other brother Siraj Nizami was a writer specializing in Sufism.

His son Mudassar Nazar also represented Pakistan in cricket for many years in the 1970s and 1980s, and he was the uncle of Pakistani cricketer Mohammad Ilyas.

Career 
In October 1952, in Pakistan's second Test match and first Test victory, he became the first player to score a Test century for Pakistan, and the first player to remain on the ground for an entire Test match. An opening batsman, he carried his bat for his score of '124 not out' in Pakistan's total of 331 in an innings victory over India, batting for 8 hours 35 minutes.

Shortly after the series, he injured his arm, ending his career. According to Omar Noman, "as the famous story goes," Nazar sustained the injury jumping out from the house window of the film actress Noor Jehan when her film producer husband Shaukat Hussain Rizvi returned home unexpectedly and surprised them. There were persistent rumors in the local newspapers, at the time, of a romantic affair going on between Noor Jehan and Nazar Mohammad.

References

External links

1921 births
1996 deaths
Pakistani cricketers
Pakistan Test cricketers
Pakistani cricket umpires
Cricketers from Lahore
Muslims cricketers
North Zone cricketers
Punjab (Pakistan) cricketers
Northern India cricketers
Punjab University cricketers
Government Islamia College alumni
Punjabi people